Samuel Lee Searcy is an American politician who was a Democratic member of the North Carolina General Assembly representing the state's 17th Senate district from 2019 until his resignation in 2020.

Career
Searcy defeated Tamara Barringer on November 6, 2018, as the nominee of the Democratic Party. Searcy won by a margin of 50 percent to 47 percent for Barringer. In November 2020, Searcy was reelected to a second term by defeating Mark Cavaliero by a margin of 51 to 44 percent. In November 2020, Searcy launched CliniStart, along with Brad Wilson, the former CEO of Blue Cross and Blue Shield of NC. Searcy then resigned before his term began in January 2021.

In July 2021, Governor Roy Cooper appointed Searcy to a six-year term on the North Carolina Capital State Board of Community Colleges.

On March 4, 2022, Searcy announced that he had filed to run in the Democratic primary for the newly drawn 13th congressional district. This district now covers southern Wake County, as well as all of Johnston County and parts of both Wayne and Harnett Counties.

References

External links

Democratic Party North Carolina state senators
Living people
21st-century American politicians
1977 births
Appalachian State University alumni
People from Hendersonville, North Carolina
Candidates in the 2022 United States House of Representatives elections